The following is a list of stories featuring The Shadow, a fictional vigilante.

Pulp magazine novels
A list of pulp magazine novels featuring The Shadow. All these novels were published under the name Maxwell Grant. Unless noted, all were written by Walter B. Gibson and originally appeared in The Shadow Magazine and its variants, published by Street and Smith. Novels that have been reprinted are noted accordingly—see "Reprint history" below for more information.

1–100

 001. "The Living Shadow", published April 1, 1931: Bantam #1, Pyramid #1, Sanctum Books #47
 002. "Eyes of the Shadow", published July 1, 1931: Bantam #2, Sanctum Books #48
 003. "The Shadow Laughs", published October 1, 1931: Bantam #3, Sanctum Books #49
 004. "The Red Menace", published November 1, 1931: Pyramid #7, Sanctum Books #91
 005. "Gangdom's Doom", published December 1, 1931: Bantam #7, Sanctum Books #101
 006. "The Death Tower", published January 1, 1932: Bantam #4, Sanctum Books #125
 007. "The Silent Seven", published February 1, 1932: Pyramid #10, Sanctum Books #125
 008. "The Black Master", published March 1, 1932: Pyramid #2, Sanctum Books Shadow Annual #2
 009. "Mobsmen on the Spot", published April 1, 1932: Pyramid #3, Sanctum Books #129
 010. "Hands in the Dark", published May 1, 1932: Pyramid #4, Sanctum Books #130
 011. "Double Z", published June 1, 1932: Pyramid #5, Sanctum Books #141
 012. "The Crime Cult", published July 1, 1932: Pyramid #6, Sanctum Books #145
 013. "The Blackmail Ring", published August 1, 1932: Sanctum Books #34
 014. "Hidden Death", published September 1, 1932: Bantam #6, Sanctum Books #121
 015. "Green Eyes", published October 1, 1932: Pyramid #13, Sanctum Books #137
 016. "The Ghost Makers", published October 15, 1932: Bantam #5, Sanctum Books #124
 017. "The Five Chameleons", published November 1, 1932: Sanctum Books #57
 018. "Dead Men Live", published November 15, 1932: Sanctum Books #38
 019. "The Romanoff Jewels", published December 1, 1932: Pyramid #9, Sanctum Books #103
 020. "Kings of Crime", published December 15, 1932: Pyramid #11, Sanctum Books #139
 021. "Shadowed Millions", published January 1, 1933: Pyramid #12: Sanctum Books #128
 022. "The Creeping Death", published January 15, 1933: Pyramid #14, Sanctum Books #134
 023. "The Shadow's Shadow", published February 1, 1933: Pyramid #16, Sanctum Books Shadow Annual #2
 024. "Six Men of Evil", published February 15, 1933: Nostalgia Ventures #13
 025. "Fingers of Death", published March 1, 1933: Pyramid #17, Sanctum Books #132
 026. "Murder Trail", published March 15, 1933: Pyramid #18, Sanctum Books #129
 027. "The Silent Death", published April 1, 1933: Pyramid #22, Sanctum Books #127
 028. "The Shadow's Justice", published April 15, 1933: Nostalgia Ventures #6
 029. "The Golden Grotto", published May 1, 1933: Sanctum Books #101
 030. "The Death Giver", published May 15, 1933: Pyramid #23, Sanctum Books Shadow Annual #2
 031. "The Red Blot", published June 1, 1933: Nostalgia Ventures #3
 032. "The Ghost of the Manor", published June 15, 1933: Sanctum Books #66
 033. "The Living Joss", published July 1, 1933: Sanctum Books #51
 034. "The Silver Scourge", published July 15, 1933: Sanctum Books #32
 035. "The Black Hush", published August 1, 1933: Sanctum Books #47
 036. "Isle of Doubt", published August 15, 1933:  Sanctum Books #148
 037. "The Grove of Doom", published September 1, 1933: Grosset and Dunlop, Tempo Books (both edited text), Nostalgia Ventures #14 
 038. "Master of Death", published September 15, 1933: Sanctum Books #28
 039. "The Road of Crime", published October 1, 1933: Nostalgia Ventures #11
 040. "The Death Triangle", published October 15, 1933: Sanctum Books #100
 041. "The Killer", published November 1, 1933: Sanctum Books #107
 042. "Mox", published November 15, 1933: Pyramid #8, Sanctum Books #116
 043. "The Crime Clinic", published December 1, 1933: Sanctum Books #40
 044. "Treasures of Death", published December 15, 1933: Sanctum Books #89
 045. "The Embassy Murders", published January 1, 1934: Sanctum Books #56
 046. "The Wealth Seeker", published January 15, 1934: Pyramid #21, Sanctum Books #136
 047. "The Black Falcon", published February 1, 1934: Nostalgia Ventures #5
 048. "Gray Fist", published February 15, 1934: Pyramid #15, Sanctum Books #137
 049. "Circle of Death", published March 1, 1934: Sanctum Books #78
 050. "The Green Box", published March 15, 1934: Sanctum Books #59
 051. "The Cobra", published April 1, 1934: Nostalgia Ventures #7
 052. "Crime Circus", published April 15, 1934: Sanctum Books #79
 053. "Tower of Death", published May 1, 1934: Nostalgia Ventures #22
 054. "Death Clew", published May 15, 1934: Sanctum Books #67
 055. "The Key", published June 1, 1934: Sanctum Books #43
 056. "The Crime Crypt", published June 15, 1934: Sanctum Books Shadow Annual #1
 057. "Charg, Monster", published July 1, 1934: Pyramid #20, Sanctum Books #127
 058. "Chain of Death", published July 15, 1934: Sanctum Books #41
 059. "The Crime Master", published August 1, 1934: Sanctum Books #52
 060. "Gypsy Vengeance", published August 15, 1934: Sanctum Books #65
 061. "Spoils of The Shadow", published September 1, 1934: Sanctum Books #71
 062. "The Garaucan Swindle", published September 15, 1934: Sanctum Books #69
 063. "Murder Marsh", published October 1, 1934: Sanctum Books #130
 064. "The Death Sleep", published October 15, 1934: Sanctum Books #69
 065. "The Chinese Disks", published November 1, 1934: Nostalgia Ventures #2
 066. "Doom on the Hill", published November 15, 1934: Sanctum Books #105
 067. "The Unseen Killer", published December 1, 1934: Nostalgia Ventures #18
 068. "Cyro", published December 15, 1934: Sanctum Books #62
 069. "The Four Signets", published January 1, 1935:  Sanctum Books #122
 070. "The Blue Sphinx", published January 15, 1935: Nostalgia Ventures #20
 071. "The Plot Master", published February 1, 1935: Nostalgia Ventures #21
 072. "The Dark Death", published February 15, 1935: Sanctum Books #31
 073. "Crooks Go Straight", published March 1, 1935: Nostalgia Ventures #11
 074. "Bells of Doom", published March 15, 1935: Sanctum Books #42
 075. "Lingo", published April 1, 1935: Nostalgia Ventures #9
 076. "The Triple Trail", published April 15, 1935: Sanctum Books #61
 077. "The Golden Quest", published May 1, 1935: Sanctum Books #54
 078. "The Third Skull", published May 15, 1935: Sanctum Books #37
 079. "Murder Every Hour", published June 1, 1935: Sanctum Books #81
 080. "The Condor", published June 15, 1935: Sanctum Books #35
 081. "The Fate Joss", published July 1, 1935: Nostalgia Ventures #17
 082. "Atoms of Death", published July 15, 1935: Sanctum Books #44
 083. "The Man From Scotland Yard", published August 1, 1935: Sanctum Books #70
 084. "The Creeper", published August 15, 1935: Sanctum Books #88
 085. "Mardi Gras Mystery", published September 1, 1935: Sanctum Books #99
 086. "The London Crimes", published September 15, 1935: Nostalgia Ventures #8
 087. "The Ribbon Clues", published October 1, 1935: Sanctum Books #64
 088. "The House That Vanished", published October 15, 1935: Sanctum Books #46
 089. "The Chinese Tapestry", published November 1, 1935: Sanctum Books #95
 090. "The Python", published November 15, 1935: Sanctum Books #27
 091. "Zemba", published December 1, 1935: Pyramid #19, Sanctum Books #70
 092. "The Case of Congressman Coyd", December 15, 1935: Sanctum Books #43
 093. "The Ghost Murders", published January 1, 1936:  Sanctum Books #135
 094. "Castle of Doom", published January 15, 1936: Nostalgia Ventures #8
 095. "Death Rides the Skyway", published February 1, 1936: Sanctum Books #64
 096. "The North Woods Mystery", published February 15, 1936: Sanctum Books #96
 097. "The Voodoo Master", published March 1, 1936: Nostalgia Ventures #3
 098. "The Third Shadow", published March 15, 1936: Nostalgia Ventures #7
 099. "The Salamanders", published April 1, 1936: Nostalgia Ventures #5
 100. "The Man From Shanghai", published April 15, 1936: Sanctum Books #50

101–200
 101. "The Gray Ghost", published May 1, 1936: Sanctum Books #25
 102. "City of Doom", published May 15, 1936: Nostalgia Ventures #10
 103. "The Crime Oracle", published June 1, 1936: Dover Facsimile, Sanctum Books #146
 104. "Murder Town", published June 15, 1936:  Sanctum Books #148
 105. "The Yellow Door", published July 1, 1936: Sanctum Books #89
 106. "The Broken Napoleons", published July 15, 1936: Nostalgia Ventures #6
 107. "The Sledge-hammer Crimes", published August 1, 1936: Sanctum Books #78
 108. "Terror Island", published August 15, 1936: Sanctum Books #45
 109. "The Golden Masks", published September 1, 1936: Nostalgia Ventures #18
 110. "Jibaro Death", published September 15, 1936: Nostalgia Ventures #20
 111. "City of Crime", published October 1, 1936: Nostalgia Ventures #16
 112. "Death By Proxy", published October 15, 1936: Sanctum Books #114
 113. "Partners of Peril" by Theodore Tinsley, published November 1, 1936: Nostalgia Ventures #9
 114. "The Strange Disappearance of Joe Cardona", published November 15, 1936: Sanctum Books #33
 115. "Seven Drops of Blood", published December 1, 1936: Sanctum Books #73
 116. "Intimidation, Inc.", published December 15, 1936: Sanctum Books #72
 117. "Vengeance Is Mine", published January 1, 1937: Sanctum Books #26
 118. "Fox Hound" by Theodore Tinsley, published January 15, 1937: Sanctum Books #66
 119. "Loot of Death", published February 1, 1937: Sanctum Books #114 
 120. "Quetzal", published February 15, 1937: Nostalgia Ventures #24
 121. "Death Token", published March 1, 1937: Sanctum Books #112
 122. "Murder House", published March 15, 1937: Sanctum Books #92
 123. "Washington Crime", published April 1, 1937: Nostalgia Ventures #24
 124. "The Masked Headsman", published April 15, 1937: Sanctum Books #54
 125. "The Cup of Confucius" by Theodore Tinsley, published May 1, 1937: Sanctum Books #120
 126. "Treasure Trail", published May 15, 1937: Sanctum Books #86
 127. "Brothers of Doom", published June 1, 1937: Sanctum Books #93
 128. "The Shadow's Rival", published June 15, 1937: Sanctum Books #29
 129. "Crime, Insured", published July 1, 1937: Nostalgia Ventures #1
 130. "House of Silence", published July 15, 1937: Sanctum Books #71
 131. "The Shadow Unmasks", published August 1, 1937: Nostalgia Ventures #15
 132. "The Yellow Band", published August 15, 1937: Nostalgia Ventures #15
 133. "Buried Evidence", published September 1, 1937: Sanctum Books #44
 134. "The Radium Murders", published September 15, 1937: Sanctum Books #111
 135. "The Pooltex Tangle" by Theodore Tinsley, published October 1, 1937: Sanctum Books #87
 136. "The Keeper's Gold", published October 15, 1937: Sanctum Books #115
 137. "Death Turrets", published November 1, 1937: Sanctum Books #87
 138. "Teeth of the Dragon", published November 15, 1937: Dover Facsimile, Sanctum Books #118
 139. "The Sealed Box", published December 1, 1937: Sanctum Books #30
 140. "Racket Town", published December 15, 1937: Sanctum Books #30
 141. "The Crystal Buddha", published January 1, 1938: Sanctum Books #74
 142. "Hills of Death", published January 15, 1938: Sanctum Books #56
 143. "The Fifth Napoleon" by Theodore Tinsley, published February 1, 1938: Sanctum Books #52
 144. "The Murder Master", published February 15, 1938: Nostalgia Ventures #4
 145. "The Golden Pagoda", published March 1, 1938: Nostalgia Ventures #17
 146. "Face of Doom", published March 15, 1938: Sanctum Books #39
 147. "The Crimson Phoenix" by Theodore Tinsley, published April 1, 1938: Sanctum Books #86
 148. "Serpents of Siva", published April 15, 1938:Nostalgia Ventures #12
 149. "Cards of Death", published May 1, 1938: Sanctum Books#40
 150. "The Hand", published May 15, 1938: Sanctum Books #33
 151. "Voodoo Trail", published June 1, 1938: Nostalgia Ventures #19
 152. "The Rackets King", published June 15, 1938: Sanctum Books #28
 153. "Murder For Sale", published July 1, 1938: Sanctum Books #34
 154. "The Golden Vulture" cowritten by Lester Dent, published July 15, 1938: Nostalgia Ventures #1
 155. "Death Jewels", published August 1, 1938: Nostalgia Ventures #21
 156. "The Green Hoods", published August 15, 1938: Sanctum Books #55
 157. "The Golden Dog Murders" by Theodore Tinsley, published September 1, 1938: Sanctum Books #50
 158. "Crime Over Boston", published September 15, 1938: Sanctum Books #83
 159. "The Dead Who Lived", published October 1, 1938:  Sanctum Books #144                                  
 160. "Vanished Treasure", published October 15, 1938: Sanctum Books #131
 161. "The Voice", published November 1, 1938: Sanctum Books #123
 162. "Chicago Crime", published November 15, 1938: Sanctum Books #35
 163. "Shadow Over Alcatraz", published December 1, 1938: Nostalgia Ventures #16
 164. "Double Death" by Theodore Tinsley, published December 15, 1938: Sanctum Books #104
 165. "Silver Skull", published January 1, 1939: Sanctum Books #55
 166. "Crime Rides the Sea", published January 15, 1939: Sanctum Books #36
 167. "Realm of Doom", published February 1, 1939: Sanctum Books #37
 168. "The Lone Tiger", published February 15, 1939: Sanctum Books #90
 169. "River of Death" by Theodore Tinsley, published March 1, 1939: Sanctum Books #36
 170. "The Vindicator", published March 15, 1939: Sanctum Books #74
 171. "Death Ship", published April 1, 1939: Sanctum Books #76
 172. "Battle of Greed", published April 15, 1939: Sanctum Books #26
 173. "Death's Harlequin" by Theodore Tinsley, published May 1, 1939: Nostalgia Ventures #19
 174. "The Three Brothers", published May 15, 1939: Sanctum Books #93
 175. "Smugglers of Death", published June 1, 1939: Nostalgia Ventures #23
 176. "City of Shadows", published June 15, 1939: Sanctum Books #84
 177. "Noose of Death" by Theodore Tinsley, published July 1, 1939: Sanctum Books #79
 178. "Death From Nowhere", published July 15, 1939: Sanctum Books #73
 179. "Isle of Gold", published August 1, 1939: Sanctum Books #131
 180. "Wizard of Crime", published August 15, 1939: Sanctum Books #46
 181. "The Crime Ray", published September 1, 1939: Sanctum Books #39
 182. "The Golden Master", published September 15, 1939: Mysterious Press, Sanctum Books #75
 183. "Castle of Crime", published October 1, 1939: Sanctum Books #58
 184. "The Masked Lady", published October 15, 1939: Nostalgia Ventures #14
 185. "Ships of Doom", published November 1, 1939:  Sanctum Books #135
 186. "City of Ghosts", published November 15, 1939: Sanctum Books #45
 187. "Shiwan Khan Returns", published December 1, 1939: Mysterious Press, Sanctum Books #80
 188. "House of Shadows", published December 15, 1939: Sanctum Books #31
 189. "Death's Premium", published January 1, 1940: Sanctum Books #41
 190. "The Hooded Circle", published January 15, 1940: Nostalgia Ventures #22
 191. "The Getaway Ring", published February 1, 1940: Sanctum Books #59
 192. "Voice of Death", published February 15, 1940: Sanctum Books #49
 193. "The Invincible Shiwan Khan", published March 1, 1940: Sanctum Books #80
 194. "The Veiled Prophet", published March 15, 1940: Sanctum Books #65
 195. "The Spy Ring", published April 1, 1940: Sanctum Books #82
 196. "Prince of Evil" by Theodore Tinsley, published April 15, 1940: Sanctum Books #60
 197. "Death in the Stars", published May 1, 1940: Sanctum Books #84
 198. "Masters of Death", published May 15, 1940: Sanctum Books #85
 199. "Scent of Death", published June 1, 1940:  Sanctum Books #126
 200. "Q", published June 15, 1940: Sanctum Books #94

201–300
 201. "Murder Genius" by Theodore Tinsley, originally published July 1, 1940: Sanctum Books #61
 202. "Gems of Doom", originally published July 15, 1940: Sanctum Books #98
 203. "Crime at Seven Oaks", originally published August 1, 1940: Sanctum Books #97
 204. "The Fifth Face", originally published August 15, 1940: Nostalgia Ventures #10
 205. "Crime County", originally published September 1, 1940: Sanctum Books #116
 206. "The Man Who Died Twice" by Theodore Tinsley, originally published September 15, 1940: Sanctum Books #62
 207. "The Wasp", originally published October 1, 1940: Sanctum Books #57
 208. "City of Fear" by Theodore Tinsley, originally published October 15, 1940: Sanctum Books #99
 209. "Crime Over Miami", originally published November 1, 1940: Sanctum Books #83
 210. "The Devil's Paymaster" by Theodore Tinsley, originally published November 15, 1940: Sanctum Books #63
 211. "Xitli, God of Fire", originally published December 1, 1940: Sanctum Books #67
 212. "The Shadow, The Hawk and the Skull", originally published December 15, 1940: Sanctum Books #27
 213. "Forgotten Gold", originally published January 1, 1941: Sanctum Books #115
 214. "The Green Terror" by Theodore Tinsley, originally published January 15, 1941: Sanctum Books Shadow Annual #1
 215. "The Wasp Returns", originally published February 1, 1941: Sanctum Books #63
 216. "The Chinese Primrose", originally published February 15, 1941:  Sanctum Books #126
 217. "Mansion of Crime", originally published March 1, 1941:  Sanctum Books #150
 218. "The White Column" by Theodore Tinsley, originally published March 15, 1941: Sanctum Books #82
 219. "The Time Master", originally published April 1, 1941: Sanctum Books #81
 220. "The House on the Ledge", originally published April 15, 1941: Sanctum Books #110
 221. "The League of Death", originally published May 1, 1941: Sanctum Books #110
 222. "Master of Flame" by Theodore Tinsley, originally published May 15, 1941: Sanctum Books #117
 223. "Crime Under Cover", originally published June 1, 1941: Sanctum Books #103
 224. "The Thunder King", originally published June 15, 1941: Sanctum Books #68
 225. "The Star of Delhi", originally published July 1, 1941: Sanctum Books #68
 226. "The Blur", originally published July 15, 1941: Sanctum Books #109
 227. "The Crimson Death" by Theodore Tinsley, originally published August 1, 1941: Sanctum Books #100
 228. "The Shadow Meets The Mask", originally published August 15, 1941:  Sanctum Books #143
 229. "Gems of Jeopardy" by Theodore Tinsley, originally published September 1, 1941:  Sanctum Books #150
 230. "The Devil Master", originally published September 15, 1941: Sanctum Books #29
 231. "Garden of Death", originally published October 1, 1941: Sanctum Books #53
 232. "Dictator of Crime", originally published October 15, 1941: Sanctum Books #38
 233. "The Blackmail King", originally published November 1, 1941: Nostalgia Ventures #23
 234. "Temple of Crime", originally published November 15, 1941: Sanctum Books #77
 235. "Murder Mansion", originally published December 1, 1941: Sanctum Books #138
 236. "Crime's Stronghold", originally published December 15, 1941: Sanctum Books #119
 237. "Alibi Trail", originally published January 1, 1942:  Sanctum Books #151
 238. "The Book of Death", originally published January 15, 1942: Sanctum Books #32
 239. "Death Diamonds", originally published February 1, 1942: Sanctum Books #119
 240. "Blue Face" by Theodore Tinsley, originally published February 15, 1942: Sanctum Books #109
 241. "Vengeance Bay", originally published March 1, 1942: Sanctum Books #108
 242. "Formula for Crime", originally published March 15, 1942: Sanctum Books #94
 243. "Room of Doom", originally published April 1, 1942: Sanctum Books #106
 244. "The Jade Dragon", originally published April 15, 1942: Doubleday Crime Club; Sanctum Books #95
 245. "The Northdale Mystery", originally published May 1, 1942: Sanctum Books #97
 246. "Death's Bright Finger" by Theodore Tinsley, originally published May 15, 1942: Sanctum Books #75
 247. "Twins of Crime", originally published June 1, 1942:  Sanctum Books #150
 248. "The Devil's Feud", originally published June 15, 1942:  Sanctum Books #150
 249. "Five Ivory Boxes", originally published July 1, 1942:  Sanctum Books #142
 250. "Death About Town", originally published July 15, 1942: Sanctum Books #96
 251. "Legacy of Death", originally published August 1, 1942: Sanctum Books #113
 252. "Judge Lawless", originally published August 15, 1942: Sanctum Books #51
 253. "The Vampire Murders", originally published September 1, 1942: Sanctum Books #53
 254. "Syndicate of Sin" by Theodore Tinsley, originally published September 15, 1942: Sanctum Books #133
 255. "The Devil's Partner" by Theodore Tinsley, originally published October 1, 1942: Sanctum Books #113
 256. "Clue for Clue", originally published October 15, 1942: Sanctum Books #105
 257. "Trail of Vengeance", originally published November 1, 1942:  Sanctum Books #147
 258. "The Murdering Ghost", originally published November 15, 1942: Sanctum Books #42
 259. "The Hydra", originally published December 1, 1942: Nostalgia Ventures #4
 260. "The Money Master", originally published December 15, 1942: Sanctum Books #48
 261. "The Museum Murders", originally published January 1, 1943: Sanctum Books #107
 262. "Death's Masquerade", originally published January 15, 1943: Sanctum Books #88
 263. "The Devil Monsters", originally published February 1, 1943: Nostalgia Ventures #13
 264. "Wizard of Crime", originally published February 15, 1943: Sanctum Books #72
 265. "The Black Dragon", originally published March 1, 1943: Sanctum Books #76
 266. "Young Men of Death" by Theodore Tinsley, originally published April 1, 1943: Sanctum Books #138
 267. "The Robot Master", originally published May 1, 1943: Sanctum Books #104
 268. "Murder Lake", originally published June 1, 1943:  Sanctum Books #140
 269. "The Golden Doom" by Theodore Tinsley, originally published July 1, 1943:  Sanctum Books #151
 270. "Messenger of Death", originally published August 1, 1943: Sanctum Books #60
 271. "House of Ghosts", originally published September 1, 1943: Doubleday Crime Club, Sanctum Books #124
 272. "King of the Black Market", originally published October 1, 1943: Sanctum Books #102
 273. "The Muggers", originally published November 1, 1943: Sanctum Books #90
 274. "Murder by Moonlight", originally published December 1, 1943: Grosset and Dunlop (edited text), Sanctum Books #146
 275. "The Crystal Skull", originally published January 1, 1944: Sanctum Books #111
 276. "Syndicate of Death", originally published February 1, 1944:  Sanctum Books #140
 277. "The Toll of Death", originally published March 1, 1944: Sanctum Books #143
 278. "Crime Caravan", originally published April 1, 1944: Sanctum Books #102
 279. "Freak Show Murders", originally published May 1, 1944: Doubleday Crime Club, Sanctum Books #149
 280. "Voodoo Death", originally published June 1, 1944: Grosset and Dunlop (edited text), Sanctum Books #85
 281. "Town of Hate", originally published July 1, 1944: Sanctum Books #117
 282. "Death in the Crystal", originally published August 1, 1944: Sanctum Books #92
 283. "The Chest of Chu Chan", originally published September 1, 1944: Sanctum Books #106
 284. "The Shadow Meets The Mask", originally published October 1, 1944: Sanctum Books #121
 285. "Fountain of Death", originally published November 1, 1944:  Sanctum Books #148
 286. "No Time for Murder", originally published December 1, 1944: Sanctum Books #120
 287. "Guardian of Death", originally published January 1, 1945: Sanctum Books #136 
 288. "Merry Mrs. Macbeth", originally published February 1, 1945: Sanctum Books #133
 289. "Five Keys To Crime", originally published March 1, 1945:  Sanctum Books #122
 290. "Death Has Grey Eyes", originally published April 1, 1945: Sanctum Books #108
 291. "Tear-Drops of Buddha", originally published May 1, 1945: Sanctum Books #98
 292. "Three Stamps of Death", originally published June 1, 1945: Sanctum Books #112
 293. "The Mask of Mephisto", originally published July 1, 1945: Doubleday Crime Club, Sanctum Books #140
 294. "Murder By Magic", originally published August 1, 1945: Doubleday Crime Club, Sanctum Books #149
 295. "The Taiwan Joss", originally published September 1, 1945: Sanctum Books #145
 296. "A Quarter of Eight", originally published October 1, 1945: Doubleday Crime Club; Sanctum Books #142
 297. "The White Skulls", originally published November 1, 1945: Sanctum Books #25
 298. "The Stars Promise Death", originally published December 1, 1945:  Sanctum Bools #139
 299. "The Banshee Murders", originally published January 1, 1946: Sanctum Books #134
 300. "Crime Out Of Mind", originally published February 1, 1946:  Sanctum Books #149

301–325
 301. "Mother Goose Murders", published March 1, 1946: Doubleday Crime Club, Sanctum Books #147
 302. "Crime Over Casco", published April 1, 1946: Doubleday Crime Club, Sanctum Books #144
 303. "The Curse of Thoth", published May 1, 1946: Sanctum Books #77
 304. "Alibi Trail", published June 1, 1946: Sanctum Books #123
 305. "Malmordo", published July 1, 1946: Nostalgia Ventures #2
 306. "The Blackest Mail" by Bruce Elliott, published August 1, 1946:  Sanctum Books #132
 307. "Happy Death Day" by Bruce Elliott, published September 1, 1946: NEVER REPRINTED
 308. "The Seven Deadly Arts" by Bruce Elliott, published October 1, 1946: Sanctum Books #100
 309. "No Safety In Numbers" by Bruce Elliott, published November 1, 1946: Sanctum Books #128
 310. "Death on Ice" by Bruce Elliott, published December 1, 1946: Sanctum Books #141
 311. "Death Stalks the U.N." by Bruce Elliott, published January 1, 1947:NEVER REPRINTED
 312. "Murder in White" by Bruce Elliott, published March 1, 1947: Sanctum Books #136
 313. "Room 1313" by Bruce Elliott, published May 1, 1947: Sanctum Books #60
 314. "Model Murder" by Bruce Elliott, published July 1, 1947: Sanctum Books #86
 315. "Svengali Kill" by Bruce Elliott, published September 1, 1947: Sanctum Books #149
 316. "Jabberwocky Thrust" by Bruce Elliott, published November 1, 1947: Sanctum Books #50
 317. "Ten Glass Eyes" by Bruce Elliott, published January 1, 1948:  Sanctum Books #142
 318. "The Television Murders" by Bruce Elliott, published March 1, 1948:  Sanctum Books #151
 319. "Murder on Main Street" by Bruce Elliott, published May 1, 1948:NEVER REPRINTED
 320. "Reign of Terror" by Bruce Elliott, published July 1, 1948: Sanctum Books #75
 321. "Jade Dragon", published September 1, 1948: Doubleday Crime Club, Sanctum Books #118
 322. "Dead Man's Chest", published Fall 1948: Sanctum Books #58
 323. "The Magigals Mystery", published Winter 1949: Nostalgia Ventures #12
 324. "The Black Circle", published Spring 1949: Sanctum Books #91
 325. "The Whispering Eyes", published Summer 1949:  Sanctum Books #151

Belmont Books paperback novels
A list of original novels featuring The Shadow and published as paperback books by Belmont Books. These have been numbered 326 to 334.  The first of these novels, Return of the Shadow, was the only one written by Walter B. Gibson. The rest were pastiches written by Dennis Lynds (a.k.a. Michael Collins).

 326. Return of The Shadow, published September 1, 1963 (a new novel written by Walter B. Gibson)
 327. The Shadow Strikes by Dennis Lynds, published October 1, 1964
 328. Shadow Beware by Dennis Lynds, published January 1, 1965
 329. Cry Shadow! by Dennis Lynds, published April 1, 1965
 330. The Shadow's Revenge by Dennis Lynds, published October 1, 1965
 331. Mark of The Shadow by Dennis Lynds, published May 1, 1966
 332. Shadow-Go Mad! by Dennis Lynds, published September 1, 1966
 333. The Night of The Shadow by Dennis Lynds, published November 1, 1966
 334. The Shadow-Destination: Moon by Dennis Lynds, published March 1, 1967

Anthologies
Finally listed are two short stories featuring The Shadow, and published as anthology items.  These have been numbered 335 and 336.  Both of these short stories were written by Walter B. Gibson.

 335. "The Riddle of the Rangoon Ruby", published June 1, 1979 in The Shadow Scrapbook fan publication
 336. "Blackmail Bay", published February 1, 1980 in The Duende History of The Shadow Magazine fan publication

See also: http://www.shadowsanctum.net/index.html

Reprint history
The first three Shadow novels were issued in small hardcover versions in 1935 by the Ideal Library.

There were three Shadow annuals, in 1942, 1943 and 1947. Each annual would reprint three earlier published novels. (The three novels in each annual were edited to shorter lengths to fit the prescribed size of the publications.)

The next reprints of the original pulp stories did not appear until after the original stories ended in 1949: The Weird Adventures of The Shadow was published in 1966 by Grosset and Dunlop.  This anthology, however, considerably edited the three stories contained therein.

Grosset also published one story, "The Grove of Doom" (pulp #37) as a Tempo paperback (5320), crediting Walter Gibson as author rather than using the Maxwell Grant pseudonym.

From 1969 to 1970, Bantam Books published seven reprints of early Shadow stories (reprinting #'s 1, 2, 3, 5, 6, 14 and 16 from the original pulp series). The stories contained minor edits.

In 1974, Pyramid Books began reprinting early Shadow stories. The series, which consisted of 23 volumes, lasted through 1978.  The reprints did not follow the original order of the pulp series. (The pulps reprinted were # 1, 4, 7, 8, 9, 10, 11, 12, 15, 19, 20, 21, 22, 23, 25, 26, 27, 30, 42, 46, 48, 57 and 91.)

In 1975, two Shadow stories were published in a facsimile magazine published by Dover (reprinting pulps #103 and #138).

Eight Shadow stories were reissued in hardcover anthologies by the Doubleday Crime Club in the 1970s (reprinting pulps # 244, 271, 279, 293, 294, 296, 301 and 302). These reprints give sole credit to Walter Gibson as the author, rather than using the Maxwell Grant pseudonym on the cover.

In 1984, Mysterious Press published The Shadow and the Golden Master, a hardcover anthology that reprinted the first two appearances of Shiwan Khan, "The Golden Master" (#182) and "Shiwan Khan Returns" (#187). Dover Books would later reprint this same content in paperback.

In 2006, Sanctum Books, in association with Nostalgia Ventures, began reprinting the original pulps in near-replica editions. Each issue contains the original interior illustrations from the pulps as well as the original covers on the front and back. In late 2008, Nostalgia Ventures chose to end their association. The first 24 books were published under the Nostalgia Ventures brand, then Sanctum Books continued on their own beginning with book #25. (Sanctum Books also released a variant edition of book #9 using an alternate cover.)  As of January 2020, 151 volumes (plus 2 annuals) have been published.  Each volume reprints two novels except for volumes #50, 60, 75, 86, 100, 136, 140, 142, 148, and Annual 2, which reprint three novels in each book. The final three volumes #149, 150, and 151 contain four novels in each book.

Due to an early termination of license at the last minute, Sanctum Books was unable to publish three Shadow novels by Bruce Elliott (writer), leaving #307 ("Happy Death Day"), #311 ("Death Stalks the U. N.") and #319 ("Murder on Main Street") as the only three The Shadow pulp novels which have never been reprinted. Bruce Elliott's run of 15 novels in The Shadow magazine between 1946 and 1948 (issues #306 through 320) are held in low regard by Shadow fans because of Elliott's atypical handling of the character, best exemplified by these three particular stories in which the Shadow does not appear in his costumed identity.

References

Book series introduced in 1931

Shadow
The Shadow